Zeeland is a city in Ottawa County in the U.S. state of Michigan. The population was 5,719 at the 2020 census. The city is located at the western edge of Zeeland Charter Township.  Its name is taken from the Dutch province of Zeeland.

History
In 1847, nearly 500 Dutch citizens sailed for America ostensibly to achieve religious freedom, although their decision to immigrate was probably also influenced by other factors, such as dire economic conditions in their home province of Zeeland, Netherlands and their opposition to modern scientific and social advances of the time.

The emigrants were led by James Van de Luyster, a wealthy landowner who sold his holdings in the Netherlands to advance money for the members to pay their debts and buy passage to America.

Van de Luyster arranged for three ships to sail for the United States. He came on the first ship, arriving on June 27, 1847. He was followed by the Steketee group on July 4, and Reverend Van Der Meulen's group on August 1 of that year. The total number of settlers was 457.

The first building was a church. The town of Zeeland was platted in 1849, and the school district was organized the following year.

Within twenty-five years, Zeeland had acquired a sawmill, a wagon factory, blacksmith shops, grocery stores, and a post office.

The village officially became a city in 1907. There was a two-story brick kindergarten building, a two-story brick grade school, and a brick house building. The city also had four furniture factories, one large manufacturing plant, and several mills and smaller manufacturing industries.

Geography

The town itself is located on a hill, giving the city a higher elevation compared to the surrounding township land. Much of the outlying areas contain farmland and forest.

Demographics

2020 census
As of the census of 2020, there were 5,719 people, 2,421 households, and  1,432 families residing in the city. The racial makeup of the city was 88.4% White, 1.3% African American, 0.3% Native American, 1.6% Asian, 3.7% from other races, and 4.5% from two or more races. Hispanic or Latino of any race were 7.4% of the population.

There were 2,421 households, of which 27.8% had children under the age of 18 living with them, 47.8% were married couples living together, 30.5% had a female householder with no husband present, and 16% had a male householder with no wife present. 43.9% had someone living alone who was 60 years of age or older. The average household size was 2.22 and the average family size was 2.89.

The median age in the city was 39.2 years. 21.9% of residents were under the age of 18; 52.7% were between the age of 18 and 64; and 25.4% were 65 years of age or older.

2010 census
As of the census of 2010, there were 5,504 people, 2,246 households, and 1,426 families residing in the city. The racial makeup of the city was 93.8% White, 1.1% African American, 0.4% Native American, 1.3% Asian, 1.3% from other races, and 2.1% from two or more races. Hispanic or Latino of any race were 6.4% of the population.

There were 2,246 households, of which 31.1% had children under the age of 18 living with them, 52.5% were married couples living together, 8.2% had a female householder with no husband present, 2.8% had a male householder with no wife present, and 36.5% were non-families. 33.7% of all households were made up of individuals, and 21.3% had someone living alone who was 65 years of age or older. The average household size was 2.37 and the average family size was 3.04.

The median age in the city was 38.8 years. 25.4% of residents were under the age of 18; 7.6% were between the ages of 18 and 24; 23.8% were from 25 to 44; 20.6% were from 45 to 64; and 22.7% were 65 years of age or older. The gender makeup of the city was 44.8% male and 55.2% female.

2000 census
As of the census of 2000, there were 5,805 people, 2,283 households, and 1,490 families residing in the city. The racial makeup of the city was 93.90% White, 0.59% African American, 0.14% Native American, 1.31% Asian, 0.02% Pacific Islander, 2.10% from other races, and 1.95% from two or more races. Hispanic or Latino of any race were 4.63% of the population.

There were 2,283 households, out of which 30.9% had children under the age of 18 living with them, 55.6% were married couples living together, 7.1% had a female householder with no husband present, and 34.7% were non-families. 32.3% of all households were made up of individuals, and 20.4% had someone living alone who was 65 years of age or older.  The average household size was 2.45 and the average family size was 3.13.

In the city, ages of the residents spanned a broad range with 26.2% under the age of 18, 8.0% from 18 to 24, 26.5% from 25 to 44, 16.1% from 45 to 64, and 23.3% who were 65 years of age or older.  The median age was 37 years. For every 100 females, there were 83.2 males.  For every 100 females age 18 and over, there were 78.9 males.

The median income for a household in the city was $45,611, and the median income for a family was $53,227. Males had a median income of $35,288 versus $26,913 for females. The per capita income for the city was $20,801.  About 2.8% of families and 4.6% of the population were below the poverty line, including 5.8% of those under age 18 and 3.4% of those age 65 or over.

Education

K-12 public schools
Roosevelt Elementary School
New Groningen Elementary School
Quincy Elementary School
Adams Elementary School
Woodbridge Elementary School
Lincoln Elementary School
Cityside Middle School
Creekside Middle School
Zeeland East High School
Zeeland West High School
Innocademy Charter School (K-8)
iCademy Global (9-12)
Ottawa Area Intermediate School District
National Heritage Academies (Eagle Crest Charter Academy)

Private schools
Zeeland Christian School

School issues
In 2012, Zeeland school district superintendent Dave Barry was accused of plagiarism for using text from a blog post by Mark Rutherford without giving credit. The school board decided to punish Barry by suspending him for two weeks without pay. Barry said he respected the board's decision and promised it would not happen again, saying that he had "fallen short of the mark." Barry also said that this was not the only time he has taken credit for someone's work, but the number of times he has done so has not been released to the public.
Prior to the release of the 1998 album Follow the Leader by the band Korn, Gretchen Plewes, a Zeeland high school assistant principal, said in an interview for a Michigan newspaper that the group's music is "indecent, vulgar, obscene and intends to be insulting" after giving a student, Eric VanHoven, a one-day suspension for wearing a shirt with the Korn logo on it. WKLQ was filmed giving away hundreds of free Korn T-shirts, which were donated by the band, outside the school. Ottawa County policemen helped hand out shirts as well. Korn filed a cease and desist order against Plewes and the school district for their comments. They also threatened a multimillion-dollar lawsuit, but both actions were dropped due to the band members' personal lives.

Industry
Zeeland is home to several world-renowned companies.  Those in the city of Zeeland include:
Plascore (Honeycomb Manufacturing)
Herman Miller (Office furnishings/equipment and modern furniture for the home)
Howard Miller (Clocks and furniture)
Gentex (Automotive and aerospace)
Mead Johnson (Baby formula)
ITW Drawform

Transportation 
Along with its surrounding area, Zeeland is served by the MAX (Macatawa Area Express) transportation system, which offers both on-demand and high-speed bus service, linking different parts of the city as well as commercial, medical and government locations outside the city. This service evolved from the former "Dial-A-Ride Transportation" (DART) system.

Media

Newspapers
The Zeeland Record - The local newspaper

Radio
WHTC - Real News Now on 1450 WHTC and The New 99 7 FM
WYVN - 92 7 The Van - Classic Hits for Holland and the Lakeshore 92.7 FM
WTHS - Hope College Radio Station 89.9 FM

Sports achievements
1987, 1989–1991, 1994 Girl's Class B State Swimming and Diving Champions.
2003 Class C State Lacrosse Champions. Zeeland defeated Plymouth-Canton Chiefs 12–9. Mike DeJonge MVP.
2006 Division 4 State Football Champions. Zeeland West Dux defeated the Coopersville Broncos 22–0. - MVP Joe Leal
2006 Christopher Hodge becomes Zeeland's first male competitive cheerleader. He leads the Zeeland East Chix to first Division 2 State Championship
2011 Division 4 State Football Champions. Zeeland West Dux
2013 Division 3 State Football Champions. Zeeland West Dux
2015 Division 3 State Football Champions. Zeeland West Dux

Notable people
Kathy Arendsen, softball player and coach
M. R. DeHaan, Bible teacher, founder of the Radio Bible Class.
Paul de Kruif, microbiologist and author of popular scientific works, including the best-seller Microbe Hunters (1926)
D. J. DePree, first president of Herman Miller
Willard Ames De Pree, career American diplomat and the former United States Ambassador to Bangladesh and Mozambique.
Anthony Diekema, President of Calvin College from 1976 to 1995.
Ron Essink of the Seattle Seahawks went to Zeeland High School and Grand Valley State University, in Allendale, Michigan. He now works for the city of Zeeland.
Renae Geerlings, actress
Hans Andrew Hansen, American plant breeder
Ed Hendricks, pitcher in Major League Baseball. 
Bill Huizenga, Congressman for the 2nd District of Michigan
Jim Kaat, Retired MLB pitcher and member of the baseball Hall of Fame
Chris Kapenga, member of the Wisconsin State Senate
Donald Kroodsma, American author and ornithologist, one of the world's leading experts on the science of birdsong.
Tom Meyer,  Republican member of the Michigan House of Representatives
Thomas J. Plewes,  retired lieutenant general in the United States Army. 
Jay Riemersma, former NFL tight end for the Buffalo Bills and the Pittsburgh Steelers and former coach for the Zeeland Chix football team.
Ron Schipper,  American football coach and college athletics administrator.
George Van Peursem,  American politician from the State of Michigan.
Eugene van Tamelen,  organic chemist who is especially recognized for his contributions to bioorganic chemistry.
Jan M. Van Tamelen,  American art director
Edward Wichers,  US chemist and Associate Director of the National Bureau of Standards from 1958-62.

References

External links
City of Zeeland

 
Cities in Ottawa County, Michigan
Populated places established in 1847
1847 establishments in Michigan